Kamienie na szaniec (lit. Stones for the Rampart, also translated as Stones on the Barricade) is a 1943 non-fiction novel by Polish writer Aleksander Kamiński. Published by the Polish underground press during the World War II occupation of Poland, the book describes the acts of sabotage and armed resistance carried out by the Polish underground scout movement, the Gray Ranks, of whom Kamiński was one of the instructors and leaders.

Already immensely popular during World War II, after the war the book entered the canon of Polish literature and remains a recommended reading text for Polish students in the secondary school curriculum. It was adapted into two feature films, in 1978 and in 2014.

Origin

Kamienie na szaniec was published by the Polish underground press in 1943, during the period of German occupation of Poland in World War II. The author Aleksander Kamiński was a member of the Polish Armia Krajowa (Home Army) resistance movement, editor of the underground Biuletyn Informacyjny magazine, and one of the instructors and leaders of the Polish underground scout movement, the Gray Ranks, which took an active role in the resistance through various acts of minor resistance known as small sabotage. Kamiński based his story on the memoirs of Tadeusz Zawadzki ("Zośka"), a 22-year-old member of the Gray Ranks.

Plot

The story portrayed in the book is a slightly fictionalized account of real lives of Gray Rank members (known by their noms-de-guerre of "Rudy", "Zośka", and "Alek"), with the final act centred on the Operation Arsenal. The book tells the story of a group of Polish boy-scouts taking part in resistance movements in nazi-occupied Warsaw. A major part of the book revolves around trying to rescue "Rudy" from Gestapo captivity. Despite the success of the operation, "Rudy" dies shortly afterwards from grave injuries caused by torture during German interrogations, with "Zośka" by his side. "Alek" dies at the same time from wounds sustained during the rescue, while "Zośka" is killed a few months later in another operation.

Significance
The title of the book comes from Testament mój (My Testament), a poem by Juliusz Słowacki, and refers to the insurrectionist traditions of Polish romanticism. In that book, Kamiński redefines the meaning of scouting in times of military conflict. According to the critic Maciej Górny, describing the book's role in the complexity of subsequent events of Polish history, it became "one of  the main Polish narratives of the Second World War, appealing to sentiments of national heroism as well as contributing to symbolic self-victimization."

The relevant passage from Słowacki's poem is:

Publication
Kamienie na szaniec was published in Poland twice before the war ended, and 17 times before 1993. The book was published in English as Stones for the Rampart: The story of two lads in the Polish underground movement in 1944, and in Czech in 1948.

Reception
Despite difficulties in distribution, it quickly gained popularity in occupied Poland. Over the years the book, described as "canonical", became a recommended reading text for Polish students in the secondary school curriculum. At first, however, the book's popularity had been of concern to the Polish communist authorities after the war, due to their ambivalent or even hostile attitude towards the Home Army tradition. In the first years of communist rule, it was either criticized as irresponsible, or suppressed. It was republished following the liberalization of 1956, and eventually it was included in the recommended texts for schoolchildren even before the fall of communism in Poland.

Film adaptations
The book was made into a movie, Akcja pod Arsenałem, directed by Jan Łomnicki in 1978.

A new film based on the book, directed by Robert Gliński, was released in Poland on March 7, 2014. It was promoted by the song "4:30" by Polish singer Dawid Podsiadło.

See also
 Polish Underground State

References

External links
  (film) 
 Stones for the Rampart: The story of two lads in the Polish underground movement at WorldCat

1943 novels
Non-fiction novels
Novels set in Warsaw
Polish novels adapted into films
Scouting and Guiding in Poland
Novels set during World War II